Richard Benner (1943 –  December 2, 1990) was an American film director and screenwriter who worked predominantly in Canada. His 1977 film Outrageous! was entered into the 28th Berlin International Film Festival, where Craig Russell won the Silver Bear for Best Actor.

Benner grew up in Kentucky, studied drama in California and England, and moved to Toronto in the early 1970s. Writing for the Canadian Broadcasting Corporation, he pitched an idea for a film about a gay hairdresser with dreams of New York City success to the Canadian Film Development Corporation (now Telefilm Canada). Approved, he was able to secure financing with the help of Toronto producers, and Outrageous!, the first film to feature Craig Russell, an openly gay cabaret performer, went on to critical success at the 1977 Cannes Film Festival. Funny and sympathetic, Outrageous! is considered a landmark film in Canadian queer cinema. Ten years later, Benner talked Russell into doing a sequel (1987), which fared not nearly as well. Benner died from complications due to AIDS in 1990. In addition to his films, he directed several episodes of the Canadian television series 9B, Monsters, Street Legal and Road to Avonlea.

Selected filmography
 Outrageous! (1977)
 Happy Birthday, Gemini (1980)
 Too Outrageous! (1987)

References

External links

1943 births
1990 deaths
American male screenwriters
People from Sterling, Illinois
Film directors from Illinois
AIDS-related deaths in Canada
American LGBT screenwriters
Canadian LGBT screenwriters
LGBT film directors
Canadian gay writers
Film directors from Toronto
Writers from Toronto
American television directors
Canadian television directors
American emigrants to Canada
Screenwriters from Illinois
20th-century American male writers
20th-century Canadian screenwriters
20th-century American screenwriters
LGBT television directors
20th-century American LGBT people
American gay writers
Gay screenwriters
20th-century Canadian LGBT people